Fania nanus is a moth in the family Cossidae. It was described by Strecker in 1876. It is found in North America, where it has been recorded from Arizona, Louisiana, Mississippi and Texas.

The wingspan is about 28 mm. Adults have been recorded on wing from May to August.

References

Natural History Museum Lepidoptera generic names catalog

Moths described in 1876
Cossinae
Moths of North America
Taxa named by Herman Strecker